The 1999 Speedway Grand Prix of Sweden was the second race of the 1999 Speedway Grand Prix season. It took place on 4 June in the Motorstadium in Linköping, Sweden It was the fifth Swedish SGP and was won by wild card rider Mark Loram.

Starting positions draw 

The Speedway Grand Prix Commission nominated British rider Mark Loram and a Pole Sebastian Ułamek as Wild Card.

Heat details

The intermediate classification

See also 
 Speedway Grand Prix
 List of Speedway Grand Prix riders

References

External links 
 FIM-live.com
 SpeedwayWorld.tv

S
Speedway Grand Prix
1999